The Chicago mayoral election of 1975 was first the primary on February 25, 1975, which was followed by the general on April 1, 1975. Incumbent Richard J. Daley was elected to a record sixth term as mayor by a landslide 59% margin.  This was the first Chicago mayoral election since the ratification of the Twenty-sixth Amendment to the  United States Constitution, which lowered the voting age from 21 to 18. Only one other individual (Daley's son Richard M. Daley) has matched Daley's feat of winning six Chicago mayoral elections.

Nominations

Democratic primary
Daley fended off several challengers. For the first time since he was elected mayor, Daley was facing what appeared to be significant opposition in a Democratic primary. On paper, all three opponents he faced were serious contenders. Daley's health had declined by 1974, and he had taken an extended absence to recuperate after a June 1, 1974 surgery to unclog a partially blocked carotid artery. Amid this extended absence, speculation arose that Daley might not seek an additional term as mayor. By 1975, many believed that Daley's political stature was beginning to wane, and he was seen to be out of touch with both the times and the climate of the city. Additionally, by 1975, news stories had arisen that shows political corruption and dishonesty related to Daley and his administration.

Independent alderman William Singer was more liberal than Daley. He was reform-minded, and considered a lakefront liberal. Singer announce his campaign early, doing so in October 1973. The focus of Singer's campaign was the poor state of the public schools in the city. Singer pledged that he would visit each and every one of the city's 584 public schools. Singer also laid blame for the loss of 200,000 jobs in the city with Daley, and pledged that as mayor he would bring jobs back. Singer received support from the affluent lakefront and Hyde Park, areas that were home to the lakefront liberals. Singer had a strong grassroots organization and raised and spent between $600,000 and $700,000 for his campaign. Singer also was endorsed by congressman Ralph Metcalfe, who declined to run for mayor despite calls for him to do so. Metcalfe, a one-time ally of Daley, had become critical of what he alleged was racism and brutality in the Chicago Police Department.

African American State Senator Richard H. Newhouse Jr. was the first black candidate on the ballot in a Chicago mayoral election. Originally, four black candidates had announced they would challenge Daley. However, candidates such as criminal lawyer E. Duke McNeil dropped-out to back Newhouse. Ultimately, Newhouse would be the only black candidate on the ballot. This campaign came at a time when a number of major United States city's had seen notable campaigns by African-Americans for mayoralties, such as Maynard Jackson's successful campaign the previous year in Atlanta and Coleman Young's successful campaign two years prior in Detroit. However, in both these cities, blacks comprised a greater portion of the populace. Many supporting the efforts to elect a black mayor in Chicago in 1975 had hoped that congressman Ralph Metcalfe would run, as they believed him to have been the strongest potential black challenger to Daley. However, Metcalfe, after taking some tentative steps towards possibly running and even raising some money for a possibly candidacy, declined to run. Metcalfe endorsed Singer instead of Newhouse. Newhouse received the endorsements of Jesse Jackson and his organization PUSH. It would ultimately, not be until 1983 that Chicago would elect a black mayor.

Despite there being a black candidate in the race, the Chicago Defender endorsed Daley, as did noted African American publisher John H. Johnson. 

Former Cook County State's Attorney Edward Hanrahan also ran. His base of support was in white "ethnic" wards of the city, as black voters hated him due to the role of the office he oversaw as state's attorney in the raid that killed Fred Hampton. He was seeking to stage a political comeback after having left office after scandal. As a candidate, Harahan regularly attacked Daley for what he regarded to be Daley's, "arrogance of total political power." During the campaign, Daley refused to appear at events which featured other contenders. By the end of the primary campaign, it was evident that the race had narrowed primarily to a contest between Daley and Singer. Both of these candidates made use of media. While running a campaign heavily  on organizing the Democratic machine on the ground, Daley used television to a greater extent than he had in his previous campaigns. Singer brought in media consultant David Garth, who had recently been involved in Hugh Carey's successful New York gubernatorial campaign.

Results 
Daley carried a plurality of the vote in 48 of the city's 50 wards (35 of which he also had a simple majority of the vote in). Singer carried an outright simple majority of the vote in the two remaining wards.
Daley won 57.9% of the vote. Daley's victory was seen as surprisingly large. Daley saw only 48% of the vote in the predominantly African American wards.

Daley outperformed expectations, while his challengers underperformed in their geographic base areas. Singer had been anticipated to prevail strongly with voters in the lakefront areas, with it being believed that the independent voters in these areas would harbor distaste for scandals which plagued the Daley Administration. Instead, Daley very narrowly led Singer in the six lakefront wards, receiving 46.5% to Singers's 46.4% there. It was expected that, with Newhouse's historic candidacy as the first black mayoral candidate in the city's history, and with the city's most prominent black politician, Metacalfe, defecting from his onetime allegiance with Daley to endorse Singer, Daley would lose a significant share of African American support. However, in the city's ten black-majority wards, Daley led with 47% to Singer's 31.2% and Newhouse's 19.9%. Hanrahan was expected to perform well in ethnically white wards. However, in the eleven white "ethnic" wards, Daley received 67.2% of the vote to Singer's 22.3% and Hanrahan's mere 7.2%.

Republican primary

Despite Daley being embattled and having health problems, Republicans had difficulty recruiting a candidate to oppose him. US Attorney James R. Thompson had been speculated as a potential Republican contender for 1975, but ultimately did not run. The Republican Party ultimately settled on John Hoellen as a candidate. Hoellen was a longtime foe of Daley, and was, by 1975, the only Republican remaining on the Chicago City Council. Hoellen, however, was a reluctant candidate and was not optimistic of his prospects as a candidate. Hoellen was a "good government"-oriented politician. He hailed from the North Center neighborhood, long a German enclave of the city. A fixture on the City Council, he had been known for his passionate speeches in which he criticized waste, corruption, and inefficiency.

Socialist Workers nomination
The Socialist Workers Party nominated Willie Mae Reid, who collected 66,000 signatures on her candidature petition to be included on the general election ballot (a greater number of signatures than the number of votes she would ultimately receive).

General election
The election was effectively a rematch of the 1954 Cook County Clerk election in which Daley was challenged by Hoellen. The race was extraordinarily pro forma, with Hoellen rather ambivalent towards the race, and also focused on simultaneous campaigning to retain his aldermanic seat. Hoellen failed to even achieve strong support among fellow Republicans.

Results
Daley won a majority of the vote in each of the city's 50 wards. Hoellen also lost his reelection campaign as alderman.

References

Mayoral elections in Chicago
Chicago
Chicago
20th century in Chicago
1970s in Chicago
Richard J. Daley